The 1998–99 Miami Hurricanes men's basketball team represented the University of Miami during the 1998–99 NCAA Division I men's basketball season. The Hurricanes, led by ninth year head coach Leonard Hamilton, played their home games at the Miami Arena and were members of the Big East Conference. They finished the season 23–7, 15–3 in Big East play to finish in second place. They lost in the second round of the 1999 Big East men's basketball tournament to St. John's. They were invited to the 1999 NCAA Division I men's basketball tournament where they defeated Lafayette in the first round before falling in the second round to Purdue.

Previous season
The Hurricanes finished the 1997–98 season 18–10 overall, 11–7 in Big East play and lost in the first round of the 1998 NCAA Division I men's basketball tournament to UCLA.

Roster

Schedule

|-
!colspan=12 style=| Regular season

|-
!colspan=12 style=| Big East tournament

|-
!colspan=12 style=| NCAA tournament

References

Miami Hurricanes men's basketball seasons
Miami